Omeath railway station was a railway station in County Louth, first opened by the Dundalk, Newry and Greenore Railway, which ran a service to the port at Greenore. From Greenore, ferries ran to Holyhead in Wales, and onward trains to London Euston.   The railway was absorbed by the London & North Western Railway.

The station, which opened on 1 August 1876, finally closed on 1 January 1952.

References

London and North Western Railway
London, Midland and Scottish Railway
Railway stations opened in 1876
Railway stations closed in 1952